Peter David Kugler (born August 9, 1959), commonly known as Pete Kugler, is a former American football defensive end who played ten seasons professionally; eight in the National Football League for the San Francisco 49ers, and two seasons for the Philadelphia/Baltimore Stars of the United States Football League (USFL) in between his time with the 49ers. He played college football for Penn State University.

Although born in Philadelphia, Pennsylvania, Kugler was raised in Cherry Hill, New Jersey and was a football lineman at Cherry Hill High School East.

Kugler is the son of George F. Kugler Jr., who served as New Jersey Attorney General from 1970 to 1974. His brother Robert B. Kugler is a judge of the United States District Court for the District of New Jersey.

References

External links
Just Sports Stats

1959 births
Living people
American football defensive linemen
Cherry Hill High School East alumni
Players of American football from New Jersey
Players of American football from Philadelphia
Penn State Nittany Lions football players
People from Cherry Hill, New Jersey
San Francisco 49ers players
Philadelphia/Baltimore Stars players
Sportspeople from Camden County, New Jersey
National Football League replacement players